Distortrix is a genus of medium-sized sea snails, marine gastropod mollusks in the family Personidae, the Distortio snails.

Species
Species brought into synonymy
 Distortrix anus: synonym of Distorsio anus (Linnaeus, 1758)
 Distortrix cancellinus: synonym of Distorsio reticularis (Linnaeus, 1758)

References

External links
 Link, D. H. F. (1807-1808). Beschreibung der Naturalien-Sammlung der Universität zu Rostock. Rostock, Adlers Erben. 1 Abt. [Part 1], pp. 1–50; 2 Abt. [Part 2], pp. 51–100; 3 Abt. [Part 3], pp. 101–165; Abt. 4 [Part 4],pp. 1–30; Abt. 5 [Part 5], pp. 1–38 [1808]; Abt. 6 [Part 6], pp. 1–38
 Clench W.J. & Turner R.D. (1957). The family Cymatiidae in the western Atlantic. Johnsonia. 3(36): 189-244

Personidae